Avinash Sachdev (born 22 August 1986) is an Indian actor. He is best known for portraying Dev in Zee TV's drama series Chotti Bahu (2008–2012) and Shlok Agnihotri in StarPlus's romantic drama Iss Pyaar Ko Kya Naam Doon? Ek Baar Phir (2013–2015).

Early life
Avinash Sachdev was born and brought up in Vadodara, Gujarat. He completed his education in Vadodara. Sachdev won pageant titles such as Mr Baroda, Mr University, and Mr Gujarat (2004–2005) that compelled him to participate in the Gladrags Model Hunt. At an early age, Sachdev was interested in filmmaking production in which he contributed to several projects to develop his filmmaking skills. Later, Sachdev shifted to Mumbai, Maharashtra where he went on to pursue his career in acting.

Personal life
Sachdev married his Iss Pyaar Ko Kya Naam Doon? Ek Baar Phir co-actor Shalmalee Desai in 2015. They divorced in 2017.

Career
Initially, Sachdev started his career as an assistant director on Hatim (2004) when he was 18 years old. He also assisted Farhan Akhtar in Rock On!! (2008). He also appeared in television commercials.

He secured his first television role as a cameo in StarPlus's Karam Apnaa Apnaa (2006–2007). He played his first negative role in Sony TV's drama series Khwaish (2007–2008), followed by a double negative role in StarPlus's Kis Desh Mein Hai Meraa Dil (2008).

His first notable role was his portrayal of Dev in Zee TV's drama series Choti Bahu (2008–2012). He had participated in several world tours and concerts. In 2010, 2011, and 2012, he performed in Zee Night Concerts along with his Chotti Bahu co-star, Rubina Dilaik. He participated in Zee Heroes with a Mamta Sharma concert (2012) and Udit Narayan with Zee stars concert (2013) in South Africa. Sachdev worked as an event manager in his last few Show Time Creations concerts held in South Africa.

From 2013 to 2015, Sachdev starred in the StarPlus's romantic drama Iss Pyaar Ko Kya Naam Doon? Ek Baar Phir paired opposite Shrenu Parikh, in which he portrayed Shlok Agnihotri, an arrogant business tycoon who has a miserable past which implements his chauvinistic personality. In 2017, primarily because of Sachdev's contribution to Iss Pyaar Ko Kya Naam Doon? Ek Baar Phir, he became the second Indian actor to visit Azerbaijan. The same year, because of Sachdev's work in Iss Pyaar Ko Kya Naam Doon? Ek Baar Phir, (dubbed as Tatlı Bela in Turkey), he was invited to Turkey for a fan meet and greet event organised by Kanal 7 for the fans of Tatlı Bela to meet Avinash Sachdev as Shlok Agnihotri from Iss Pyaar Ko Kya Naam Doon? Ek Baar Phir.

In 2015, Sachdev joined the cast of Qubool Hai 4 (2015–2016) portraying Armaan Raza Sheikh, a wealthy landowner.

Sachdev was also a part of Balika Vadhu – Lamhe Pyaar Ke in 2016. This was his third television project with the production company, Sphere Origins.

In 2019, Sachdev starred in &TV's Main Bhi Ardhangini in which he portrayed Madhav Singh Thakur.

Television

Special appearances

Awards and nominations

References

External links

1985 births
20th-century Indian male actors
21st-century Indian male actors
Indian male models
Place of birth missing (living people)
Indian male soap opera actors
Living people
Male actors from Mumbai